John T. Culbertson Jr. (August 7, 1891 – July 26, 1982) was an Illinois lawyer and judge.

Early and family life

Born in Delavan, Tazewell County, Illinois, Culbertson graduated from Delavan High School. He received his law degree from Illinois Wesleyan University in 1913. In 1915, he married Helen Read, who would survive him; they had one daughter.

Career

Admitted to the Illinois bar in 1913 and the Missouri bar the following year, Culbertson taught law at the Kansas City School of Law in 1914 and 1915. He began practicing law in his hometown in 1916 and his brother Robert M. Culberton joined in 1926 and he and his son of the same name would continue that private legal practice even when John Culbertson left it upon becoming a judge. Culbertson served on the county and circuit courts for Tazewell County, Illinois from 1930 until 1934. On June 4, 1934, as the Democratic nominee, he won a special election to fill a vacancy on the 10th Circuit Court left by the death of John M Niehaus, defeating Republican George Z. Varnee by 37,972 votes to 31,654. Culbertson also served on the Illinois Appellate Court for three decades, first in the Third District and after 1964 in the Fourth District. After Illinois Supreme Court justice Ray Klingbiel resigned in a scandal, Judge Culbertson served on Illinois's highest court in 1969 and 1970 before retiring. His successor was Howard C. Ryan.

Death and legacy

Judge Culbertson died at his home in Delavan, Illinois in 1982, survived by his widow. Both are buried at Prairie Rest cemetery in Delavan.
.

Notes

1891 births
1982 deaths
People from Delavan, Illinois
Illinois Wesleyan University alumni
University of Missouri–Kansas City faculty
Missouri lawyers
Illinois state court judges
Judges of the Illinois Appellate Court
Justices of the Illinois Supreme Court
20th-century American judges
20th-century American lawyers